The Federation cup (Arabic: كأس الإتحاد الإماراتي ) was a United Arab Emirates football tournament for UAE Football League teams. Starting from the 2008-09 season or whats known as the Pro Era this tournament was replaced with UAE League Cup and it became a second tier tournament for First Division League.

Winners

Performance by club

References

Football cup competitions in the United Arab Emirates